The following is the current leaderboard for career home runs in KBO League Korean baseball. 

Lee Man-soo was the KBO's first Home Run King, retiring in 1997 with 252 career home runs. His total was surpassed by Chang Jong-hoon on May 23, 1999, and Chang retained the title for ten years. In 2009, Yang Joon-hyuk hit his 341st home run, passing Chang to become Home Run King. In 2012, Lee Seung-yeop hit his 352nd home run to claim the Home Run King title,  which he extended to 467 before he retired. (Lee Seung-yeop hit an additional 159 home runs in Nippon Professional Baseball, for a career total of 626 homers.)

Players with 200 or more home runs
 Stats updated as of October 12th, 2022.

See also
 List of KBO career hits leaders
 List of KBO career RBI leaders
 List of KBO career stolen bases leaders
 List of Major League Baseball career home run leaders
 List of top Nippon Professional Baseball home run hitters

References

Korean baseball articles
KBO career home run leaders